The Coleridge Collar is a gold necklace whose provenance is disputed. It is said to be either a 16th-century chain of office, given by King Henry VIII to his adviser Sir Edward Montagu, on the latter's appointment as Lord Chief Justice of the Common Pleas in 1546; or a 17th-century copy.

A former owner, William Coleridge, 5th Baron Coleridge, was advised by Sotheby's that the collar was a 22-carat copy, and so sold it privately, in 2006, for £35,000.

However, on 6 November 2008 the purchaser resold it, as a 20-carat original, for more than £300,000, via Sotheby's rival Christie's.

In 2012, Lord Coleridge sued Sotheby's, at the High Court, London, for the difference.  Lord Coleridge lost the case and had to pay some 90% of the costs, about £1 million.

References 

Chains
Gold
Individual necklaces